Landry Joel Tsafack N'Guémo (born 28 November 1985) is a Cameroonian former professional footballer who played as a defensive midfielder. He has previously played for Nancy, Bordeaux and Saint-Étienne in France and for Scottish club Celtic on loan. N'Guémo has played for the Cameroon national team since 2006, including at the 2010 and 2014 World Cups.

Club career

Early career
N'Guémo is a native of Dschang, a town in western Cameroon, he played for various local teams in Dschang before moving to Yaounde aged 13.

He spent a short time in EMC.

Nancy
N'Guémo was spotted by scouts of Nancy in Yaoundé and was promptly invited to France where he had trials before signing for the club aged 15. He made his debut aged 19 in August 2005 as a substitute against Lyon in a league match. He made his first start one month later against Troyes.

In January 2009, N'Guémo said he would welcome a move away from the club after being linked by French and English media with moves to Arsenal, Sunderland and Everton.

On 31 January 2009, N'Guémo scored his first goal for Nancy, a dramatic 90th-minute winner in a match against Le Havre. His second goal for the club also came in dramatic circumstances when he again netted in the 90th minute on 23 May 2009 against Marseille but Nancy were beaten 2–1.

Loan to Celtic
After days of speculation, on 16 July 2009, N'Guémo completed a one-year loan move to Celtic with an option to make it permanent. He wore the number 6 shirt the squad number previously allotted to Bobo Baldé. N'Guemo's debut game came in the 0–0 draw against Cardiff City where he was awarded as Celtic's man of the match.
He made his competitive debut in the first leg of a Champions League qualifying tie against Dynamo Moscow in Glasgow, losing 1–0. He was also part of the team that won 2–0 in the return leg in Moscow, sending Celtic through to play Arsenal in the final qualifier for the Champions League. He made his league debut away to Aberdeen in a 3–1 win for Celtic.

In total N'Guémo made 35 appearances for Celtic without scoring. At the end of his loan period the two clubs were unable to agree a transfer fee for N'Guémo and so he returned to AS Nancy.

Bordeaux
On 4 July 2011, N'Guémo moved from Nancy to Ligue 1 rivals Bordeaux, signing a three-year contract. He played in 33 of Bordeaux's 38 league fixtures in his first season there, helping the club to fifth place and qualification for the following season's Europa League. On 3 October 2013 in a Europa League tie against Maccabi Tel Aviv, N'Guémo suffered what was initially suspected to be a minor heart attack.  He was substituted and taken to hospital where he underwent extensive tests, with nothing untoward found. N'Guémo stated on his Twitter account afterwards that "There is nothing serious. I went back home from hospital after an electrocardiogram" and he returned to first team action just over two weeks later in a Ligue 1 match against Lyon.

Saint-Etienne
In January 2015, N'Guémo signed a six-month contract with Saint-Étienne.

Turkish football
On 29 August 2015, N'Guémo signed with Turkish Süper Lig club Akhisar Belediyespor on a three-year contract after being released from Saint-Étienne at the end of the 2014–15 season.

N'Guémo joined another Turkish club, Kayserispor, in January 2017, signing a contract until 2019.

International career

N'Guémo made 42 appearances for Cameroon, scoring 3 times.

Coaching career
After a spell at Norwegian side Kongsvinger in 2019, N'Guémo retired from football. In May 2020, N'Guémo was named U18 manager of french club COS Villers-les-Nancy. In June 2021, N'Guémo was hired as a youth coach at his former club, AS Nancy.

Personal life
N'Guémo is a keen falconer and keeps a modest collection of bird of prey, with his favourite, a white-tailed eagle named Mr George after George Weah.

Honours
Nancy
 French League Cup: 2006

Cameroon
Africa Cup of Nations runner-up:2008

References

External links
 
 FIFA Profile
 
 

1985 births
Footballers from Yaoundé
Living people
Association football midfielders
Cameroonian footballers
Cameroon international footballers
2008 Africa Cup of Nations players
2010 Africa Cup of Nations players
2010 FIFA World Cup players
2014 FIFA World Cup players
AS Nancy Lorraine players
Celtic F.C. players
FC Girondins de Bordeaux players
AS Saint-Étienne players
Akhisarspor footballers
Kayserispor footballers
Kongsvinger IL Toppfotball players
Ligue 1 players
Scottish Premier League players
Süper Lig players
Norwegian First Division players
Expatriate footballers in France
Expatriate footballers in Norway
Expatriate footballers in Scotland
Expatriate footballers in Turkey
Cameroonian expatriate footballers
Cameroonian expatriate sportspeople in France
Cameroonian expatriate sportspeople in Norway
Cameroonian expatriate sportspeople in Scotland
Cameroonian expatriate sportspeople in Turkey